State anti-religious publishing was a Soviet publishing house, which existed from 1932 to 1942.

History 
It was created in 1932 in Moscow, Russia as part of OGIZ, a major government owned publishing house. It was governed by the Central Board of the League of Militant Atheists.

Directors 
 A. S. Bogad

Publishing activities 
It released anti-religious literature: books on various issues of atheism and the history of religion, the attitude of the CPSU (b) about religion, about the origin of religion, history of religion and the church.

E. M. Yaroslavsky "against religion and the church," T. 1–5. (1932–1936)
I. I. Skvortsov-Stepanov "Thoughts on Religion" (1936)
V. K. Nikolsky "The Origin of Religion" (1940)
A. B. Ranovich "Essays on the History of the Early Church" (1941)
Baruch Spinoza "Tractatus Theologico-Politicus" (1934)
P. Holbach "Selected works of anti-religious" (1934)
Ernst Haeckel "Riddle" (1937).

Newspaper "Bezbozhnik" and "Antireligioznik" magazines.

Literature

References 

Publishing companies of the Soviet Union
Religion and atheism
Anti-religious campaign in the Soviet Union
Anti-Christian sentiment in Europe
Anti-Christian sentiment in Asia